Niall Garve O'Donnell (1569 – 1626) was an Irish chieftain, alternately an ally of and rebel against English rule in Ireland. He is best known for siding with the English against his kinsman Hugh Roe O'Donnell during the Nine Years' War in the 1590s.

Overview
He was the son of Conn O'Donnell, the son of Calvagh O'Donnell the ruler of the lordship of Tyrconnell. Amongst his brothers were Hugh Boy, Donal and Conn. Niall Garbh was incensed at the elevation of his cousin Hugh Roe (Red Hugh) to the chieftainship in 1592, was further alienated when the latter deprived him of his castle of Lifford, and a bitter feud between the two O'Donnells was the result.

While Red Hugh O'Donnell was engaged in the Nine Years' War against the English, Niall Garve exploited the political situation to his own advantage. Niall Garve made terms with the English government, to whom he rendered valuable service both against the O'Neills and against his cousin, enabling an English force to land at Derry under Sir Henry Docwra: Docwra for a time regarded Niall as an invaluable ally. But in 1601 he quarrelled with the Lord Deputy of Ireland, who, though willing to establish Niall Garve in the lordship of Tyrconnell, would not permit him to enforce his supremacy over Sir Cahir O'Doherty in Inishowen. Nonetheless the same year he led an Anglo-Irish force that captured Donegal. It was then laid siege to by the rebels, but Niall Garve oversaw a successful defence.

After the departure of Hugh Roe from Ireland in 1602, Niall Garve tried to seize the chieftainship, and was "inaugurated" as the 25th O'Donnell in 1603, but without the full required support of the derbfine (electoral kinship group). This was repudiated by Hugh Roe's surviving family, and especially by his younger brother Rory. To find a solution, Niall Garve, and Hugh Roe's brother Rory went to London in 1603, where the privy council endeavoured to arrange the family quarrel.

As a result, King James I of England granted some lands to Niall Garve, but raised Rory to the peerage as Rory O'Donnell, 1st Earl of Tyrconnell, and also granted him the territorial Lordship of Tyrconnell.

Niall Garve was later accused of turning against the Crown. When Sir Cahir O'Doherty launched an uprising by burning Derry in 1608, Niall Garve was charged with complicity in the ensuing O'Doherty's Rebellion. He and his son Neachtain were sent to the Tower of London, where they remained until their deaths.

Family
Niall Garve had married his cousin Nuala, sister of Hugh Roe and Rory O'Donnell. When Rory fled with Hugh O'Neill the Earl of Tyrone to Rome in 1607  (see the Flight of the Earls), Nuala, who had left her husband when he joined the English against her brother, accompanied him, taking with her, her daughter Grania. She was the subject of an Irish poem, of which an English version was written by James Mangan from a prose translation by Eugene O'Curry.

A bhean fuair faill ar an bhfeart
Thruaigh liom a bhfaghthaoi d'éisdeacht
Dá mbeath fian Gaoidheal ad ghar
Do bhiadh gud chaoineadh cognamh…

'O woman that hast found the tomb unguarded,
pitiful to me the number thou findest to listen;
were the soldiery of the Gaels at thy side there would be help with thy keening.

External links
 Gaelic Book Collections, nls.uk; accessed 5 October 2015.

References

1569 births
1626 deaths
Irish lords
People from County Donegal
16th-century Irish people
17th-century Irish people
People of the Nine Years' War (Ireland)
People of O'Doherty's rebellion
People of Elizabethan Ireland
Niall
Prisoners in the Tower of London